Gary Phillips (born Gary Edmund Philippet; February 5, 1947 – January 17, 2007) was an American musician who played keyboard with The Greg Kihn Band. He joined them in 1981, just before their US #15 hit "The Breakup Song". In 1983, they had a #2 US/#63 UK hit with "Jeopardy". He was also a writer, who sang and played guitar in the Bay Area band Copperhead along with John Cipollina. Prior to joining Copperhead he played in the San Francisco band Freedom Highway. Phillips was also a co-guitarist in the East Bay band Earth Quake and was with them (John Doukas, Robbie Dunbar, Steve Nelson and Stan Miller) for four albums (Rocking the World, 8.5, Leveled and the live Over Germany). He sang lead on "Tin Soldier" and "Street Fever". 

Late in his career, Phillips volunteered at a co-ed foster home facility (Penrith Farms), near Newport, Washington. Phillips, with his sister and brother-in-law, Jim Brewster administered the facility.

Phillips died of cancer in 2007 at age 59.

References

1947 births
2007 deaths
Musicians from San Francisco
20th-century American musicians
Place of death missing
Copperhead (band) members
The Greg Kihn Band members